Pseudomonas sRNA are non-coding RNAs (ncRNA) that were predicted by the bioinformatic program SRNApredict2. This program identifies putative sRNAs by searching for co-localization of genetic features commonly associated with sRNA-encoding genes and the expression of the predicted sRNAs was subsequently confirmed by Northern blot analysis. These sRNAs have been shown to be conserved across several pseudomonas species but their function is yet to be determined. Using Tet-Trap genetic approach RNAT genes post-transcriptionally regulated by temperature upshift were identified: ptxS (implicated in virulence) and PA5194.

See also
Bacillus subtilis sRNA
Caenorhabditis elegans sRNA
Mycobacterium tuberculosis sRNA
 Bacteroides thetaiotaomicron sRNA
NrsZ small RNA
AsponA antisense RNA
Repression of heat shock gene expression (ROSE) element
SrbA sRNA

References

RNA